Moulvi Agha Muhammad (born 1 January 1944) is a Pakistani politician who had been a member of the National Assembly of Pakistan, from 2008 to May 2018.

Early life
He was born on 1 January 1944.

Political career

He was elected to the National Assembly of Pakistan as a candidate of Muttahida Majlis-e-Amal (MMA) from Constituency NA-261 (Pishin-cum-Ziarat) in 2008 Pakistani general election. He received 30,611 votes and defeated Muhammad Sarwar Khan.

He was re-elected to the National Assembly as a candidate of Jamiat Ulema-e-Islam (F) (JUI-F) from Constituency NA-261 (Pishin-cum-Ziarat) in 2013 Pakistani general election. He received 48,712 votes and defeated Muhammad Essa Roshan, a candidate of Pashtunkhwa Milli Awami Party (PKMAP). In the same election, he ran for the seat of the National Assembly as an independent candidate from Constituency NA-263 (Loralai-cum-Musakhel-cum-Barkhan) but was unsuccessful. He received 152 votes and lost the seat to Ameer Zaman.

In 2014, he was disqualified as the member of National Assembly and re-election in the constituency was ordered. His National Assembly membership was later reinstated by The Supreme Court of Pakistan.

References

Living people
Baloch people
Pakistani MNAs 2013–2018
People from Pishin District
Jamiat Ulema-e-Islam (F) politicians
1944 births
Pakistani MNAs 2008–2013